James Nightingale may refer to:

 James Nightingale (rugby league) (born 1986), rugby league player
 James Nightingale (cricketer) (1840–1917), English cricketer
 James Nightingale (English footballer)
 James Nightingale (Scottish footballer)
 James Nightingale (Hollyoaks), a character from the British soap opera Hollyoaks